Many local variants of the Greek alphabet were employed in ancient Greece during the archaic and early classical periods, until around 400 BC, when they were replaced by the classical 24-letter alphabet that is the standard today. All forms of the Greek alphabet were originally based on the shared inventory of the 22 symbols of the Phoenician alphabet, with the exception of the letter Samekh, whose Greek counterpart Xi was used only in a sub-group of Greek alphabets, and with the common addition of Upsilon for the vowel . The system now familiar as the standard 24-letter Greek alphabet was originally the regional variant of the Ionian cities in Anatolia. It was officially adopted in Athens in 403 BC and in most of the rest of the Greek world by the middle of the 4th century BC.

Aspirate and consonant cluster symbols
A basic division into four major types of epichoric alphabets is commonly made according to their different treatment of additional consonant letters for the aspirated consonants and consonant clusters of Greek. These four types are often conventionally labelled as "green", "red", "light blue" and "dark blue" types, based on a colour-coded map in a seminal 19th-century work on the topic,  by Adolf Kirchhoff (1867). The "green" (or southern) type is the most archaic and closest to the Phoenician. The "red" (or western) type is the one that was later transmitted to the West and became the ancestor of the Latin alphabet, and bears some crucial features characteristic of that later development. The "blue" (or eastern) type is the one from which the later standard Greek alphabet emerged.

*Upsilon is also derived from waw.

The "green" (southern) type uses no additional letters beyond the Phoenician set, and typically also goes without . (However, for the analogous  there is already a dedicated letter, taken from Phoenician.) Likewise, the clusters ,  are simply spelled , . This is the system found in Crete and in some other islands in the southern Aegean, notably Thera (Santorini), Melos and Anaphe.

In addition, the red alphabet also introduced letters for the aspirates,  =  and  = . The red type is found in most parts of central mainland Greece (Thessaly, Boeotia and most of the Peloponnese), as well as the island of Euboea, and in colonies associated with these places, including most colonies in Italy.

Both of these correspond to the modern standard alphabet. The light blue system thus still has no separate letters for the clusters , . This is the system found in Athens (before 403 BC) and several Aegean islands.

This system is found in the cities of the Ionian dodecapolis, Knidos in Asia Minor, and in Corinth and Argos on the northeastern Peloponnese.

Eta and /h/

The letter eta (originally called hēta) had two different functions, both derived from the name of its Phoenician model, hēth: the majority of Greek dialects continued to use it for the consonant , similar to its Phoenician value. However, the consonant  was progressively lost from the spoken language (a process known as psilosis), and in those dialects where this had already happened early on in the archaic period,  was instead used to denote the long vowel , which occurred next in its name and was thus, in the -less dialects, its natural acrophonic value. Early psilotic dialects include eastern Ionic Greek, the Aeolic Greek of Lesbos, as well as the Doric Greek of Crete and Elis.

The distribution of vocalic  and  differs further between dialects, because the Greek language had a system of three distinct e-like phonemes: the long open-mid  (classical spelling ), the long close-mid  (later merged with the diphthong , classical spelling ), and the short vowel  (classical spelling ). This latter symbol was later turned into the diacritic sign for rough breathing by the Alexandrine grammarians.

Yet another distinction was found in a group of cities in the north-east of the Peloponnese, most notably Corinth: here, it was not the open-mid  that was distinguished among the three e-sounds, but the closed-mid . Yet another variation of the system is found in neighbouring Tiryns: it uses the letter forms of the Corinthian system,  versus E, but with the functional values of the classic eta versus epsilon system.

Archaic letters

Digamma (Wau)

The letter Digamma for the sound /w/ was generally used only in those local scripts where the sound was still in use in the spoken dialect. During the archaic period, this includes most of mainland Greece (except Attica), as well as Euboea and Crete. In Athens and in Naxos it was apparently used only in the register of poetry. Elsewhere, i.e. in most of the Aegean islands and the East, the sound /w/ was already absent from the language.

The shape of the letter varies locally and over time. Early Crete had an archaic form  (which resembled its original model, the Y-shaped Phoenician waw ), or a variant with the stem bent sideways.

San
Some local scripts used the M-shaped letter San instead of standard Sigma to denote the sound /s/. It is unclear whether the distinction between the two letters originally corresponded to different phonetic realizations of the /s/ phoneme in different dialects. Epigrapher Lilian Hamilton Jeffery (1915–1986) conjectured that San originally stood for a voiced [z] sound, and that those Doric dialects that kept San instead of Sigma may have had such a pronunciation of /s/. Roger Woodard, professor of classics at the University at Buffalo, hypothesizes that San may originally have stood for [ts]. In any case, each dialect tended to use either San or Sigma to the exclusion of the other, and while the earliest abecedaria listed both letter shapes separately in their separate alphabetic positions, later specimens from the sixth century onwards tend to list only one of them. San was used in Argos until the end of the 6th century, in Sicyon until c. 500, in Corinth until the first half of the 5th century, and in Crete for some time longer. Sicyon kept the sign as a local emblem on its coins.

Koppa
The archaic letter Koppa or Qoppa, used for the back allophone of /k/ before back vowels [o, u], was originally common to most epichoric alphabets. It began to drop out of use from the middle of the 6th century BC. Some of the Doric regions, notably Corinth, Argos, Crete and Rhodes, kept it until the 5th century BC.

Innovative letters

A few letters have arisen from innovative letter distinctions, most of them for local alphabets.

Omega 
The new letter Omega to denote the long half-open  sound was invented first in the East, in the Ionian cities of Asia Minor, at some time before 600 BC. It was created by breaking up the closed circle of the Omicron, initially near the side. The letter was subsequently turned upright and the edges curled outwards.

The Dorian city of Knidos as well as a few Aegean islands, namely Paros, Thasos and Melos, chose the exact opposite innovation, using a broken-up circle for the short and a closed circle for the long .

Sampi

'four', cf. normal spelling Ionic  vs. Attic ). This symbol later dropped out of alphabetic use, but survived in the form of the numeral symbol sampi (modern ). As an alphabetic character, it has been attested in the cities of Miletus, Ephesos, Halikarnassos, Erythrae, Teos (all situated in the region of Ionia in Asia Minor), in the island of Samos, in the Ionian colony of Massilia, and in Kyzikos (situated farther north in Asia Minor, in the region of Mysia). In Pontic Mesembria, on the Black Sea coast of Thrace, it was used on coins, which were marked with the abbreviation of the city's name, spelled .

Arcadian san

In one attested document, the Arcadocypriot Greek of Mantineia used an innovative letter similar to И, probably derived from a variant of san, to denote what was probably a -like sound in environments reflecting etymological Proto-Greek .

Pamphylian digamma

In the highly-divergent Pamphylian Greek, the letter digamma existed side by side with another distinctive form . It has been surmised that in this dialect the sound  may have changed to labiodental  in some environments. The F-shaped letter may have stood for the new  sound, while the special И-shaped form signified those positions where the old  sound was preserved.

Boeotian raised E
A special letter for a variant realization of the short  sound, was briefly used in the Boeotian city of Thespiae in the late 5th century BC. It occurred in the place of normal epsilon whenever the sound stood before another vowel. It is attested in only one document, a set of grave stelae from 424 BC.

Glyph shapes
Many of the letters familiar from the classical Greek alphabet displayed additional variation in shapes, with some of the variant forms being characteristic of specific local alphabets.

 also typically had a shorter right stem. The top of  could be curved rather than angular, approaching a Latin P. The Greek , in turn, could have a downward tail on the right, approaching a Latin R. In many red varieties,  too had variants where the left stroke was vertical, and the right edge of the letter sometimes rounded, approaching a Latin D.

The crooked shape of  could be written with different numbers of angles and strokes. Besides the classical form with four strokes, a three-stroke form resembling an angular Latin S was commonly found, and was particularly characteristic of some mainland Greek varieties including Attic and several "red" alphabets. The C-like "lunate" form of  that was later to become the standard form in late antiquity and Byzantine writing did not yet occur in the archaic alphabets.

The letter  had two principal variants: the classical straight vertical line, and a crooked form with three, four or more angular strokes. The crooked type was the older form, and remained common in those varieties where it could not be confused with sigma because sigma was absent in favour of san.

The letters  and  had multiple different forms that could often be confused with each other, as both are just an angle shape that could occur in various positions.

The letter  had different minor variants depending on the position of the middle bar, with some of them being characteristic of local varieties.

The letter  had the largest number of highly divergent local forms.

All letters could additionally occur in a mirrored form, when text was written from right to left, as was frequently done in the earliest period.

Important local alphabets

Old Attic

Among the characteristics of Athens writing were also some variant local letter forms, some of which were shared with the neighbouring (but otherwise "red") alphabet of Euboea: a form of  that resembled a Latin L and a form of  that resembled a Latin S.

By the late 5th century, use of elements of the Ionic alphabet side by side with this traditional local alphabet had become commonplace in private writing, and in 403 BC, a formal decree was passed that public writing would switch to the new Ionic orthography consistently, as part of the reform after the Thirty Tyrants. This new system was subsequently also called the "Eucleidian" alphabet, after the name of the archon Eucleides who oversaw the decision.

Euboean

The Euboean alphabet was used in the cities of Eretria and Chalcis and in related colonies in southern Italy, notably in Cumae and in Pithecusae. It was through this variant that the Greek alphabet was transmitted to Italy, where it gave rise to the Old Italic alphabets, including Etruscan and ultimately the Latin alphabet. Some of the distinctive features of the Latin as compared to the standard Greek script are already present in the Euboean model.

The Euboean alphabet belonged to the "western" ("red") type. Like most early variants it also lacked , and used  for the consonant  rather than for the vowel .

Like Athens, Euboea had a form of  lambda that resembled a Latin L and a form of  sigma that resembled a Latin S. Other elements foreshadowing the Latin forms include  gamma shaped like a pointed C,  delta shaped like a pointed D, and  rho shaped like R.

The classicist Barry B. Powell has proposed that Euboea may have been where the Greek alphabet was first employed in the late 9th century BC, and that it may have been invented specifically for the purpose of recording epic poetry.

Corinthian

For the consonant , in turn, Corinth used the special form .

Summary table
The following summary of the principal characteristic forms of representative local Greek scripts is based on the chapters on each dialect in Jeffery (1961). Letters representing long vowels are highlighted in yellow; digraphs are shown in parentheses.

References

Bibliography

Poinikastas – Epigraphic Sources for Early Greek Writing. Epigraphy site based on the archives of Lilian Jeffery, Oxford University.

 Revised and expanded translation of the Greek edition. (Christidis is the editor of the translation, not the 2001 original.)

Further reading
 Searchable Greek Inscriptions, epigraphical database, Packard Humanities Institute

Greek alphabet
Archaic Greece